The Letterklip, Afrikaans for "lettered rock", is a provincial heritage site in Namaqualand in the Northern Cape province of South Africa. The unique rock formation was fortified by dry stone walling; it was occupied from 1901 to 1902 by British forces during the Anglo-Boer War. Various regimental badges and officers' names are engraved in the rockface.

History

In 1980, it was described in the Government Gazette of South Africa:

See also

 List of Castles and Fortifications in South Africa
 Military history of South Africa
 List of castles in Africa
 History of South Africa
 List of castles
 List of forts
 Second Boer War
 List of heritage sites in Northern Cape

References

 South African Heritage Resource Agency database

Geography of the Northern Cape
Castles in South Africa
Fortifications in South Africa
Tourist attractions in South Africa
Presidential residences